= Acanthonotozomopsis =

Scientific classification
- Domain: Eukaryota
- Kingdom: Animalia
- Phylum: Arthropoda
- Class: Malacostraca
- Order: Amphipoda
- Family: Vicmusiidae
- Genus: Acanthonotozomopsis; Watling & Holman, 1980

Synonyms
- Vicmusia Just, 1990

Genus of crustaceans

Acanthonotozomopsis is a genus of crustaceans belonging to the monotypic family Vicmusiidae.

The species of this genus are found in southernmost Southern Hemisphere.

Species:

- Acanthonotozomopsis duplocoxa (Just, 1990)
- Acanthonotozomopsis pushkini (Bushueva, 1978)
